Tsumeb Constituency is an electoral constituency in the Oshikoto Region of Namibia, comprising the town area and surroundings of Tsumeb. It had a population of 44,113 in 2004 and 19,065 registered voters .

Politics
As in all constituencies in Oshikoto, SWAPO won the 2015 regional election by a landslide. Lebbeus Tobias gained 4,358 votes, while the only opposition candidate Richard Hoeseb of the Democratic Turnhalle Alliance (DTA) gained 748. The SWAPO candidate also won the 2020 regional election, albeit by a much smaller margin. Gottlieb Ndjendjela received 3,640 votes, while Matti Amoolongo of the Independent Patriots for Change (IPC), a party formed in August 2020, obtained 2,016 votes. Kariiwe Kuhanga of the Popular Democratic Movement (PDM, the new name of the DTA) came third with 322 votes.

See also
 Administrative divisions of Namibia

References

Constituencies of Oshikoto Region
States and territories established in 1992
1992 establishments in Namibia